Espen Hagh (born 10 July 1974) is a retired Norwegian football midfielder.

He is a son of Tore Hagh. He started his youth career in Mo IL and progressed into the first team. In 1995 he joined Kongsvinger. He was noted as having the team's highest O2 uptake of 76.

He did not fully break into the first team, and played only one Norwegian Premier League game in 1996. After an unsuccessful autumn loan to Lyn he joined Drøbak-Frogn ahead of the 1997 season. Here he played 20 games in the 1997 Norwegian First Division.

In 1998 he commenced physiotherapy studies in Berlin. He joined Hertha BSC II and later played for SC Siemensstadt. In 2002 he rejoined Mo IL, retiring after the 2008 season.

References

1974 births
Living people
People from Rana, Norway
Norwegian footballers
Norway youth international footballers
Kongsvinger IL Toppfotball players
Lyn Fotball players
Drøbak-Frogn IL players
Eliteserien players
Norwegian First Division players
Hertha BSC II players
Norwegian expatriate footballers
Expatriate footballers in Germany
Norwegian expatriate sportspeople in Germany
Association football midfielders
Sportspeople from Nordland